Anatoly Pozdnyakov (died 17 September 2001) was a Russian general, alternatively identified as a Lieutenant General and Major General,
and aide to Chief of the General Staff Anatoly Kvashnin.

Death
Pozdnyakov was killed on 17 September 2001 when a surface-to-air-missile downed his Mil Mi-8 helicopter in Chechnya (see 2001 Grozny Mi-8 crash).
Official reports concluded that the attack on the helicopter was orchestrated by members of a Chechen terrorist group specialized in targeting high-ranking Russian military personnel.

Journalist Anna Politkovskaya, however, claimed that Pozdnyakov was assassinated by members of the Russian military.
Pozdnyakov headed a General Staff "inspection team"
and, according to Politkovskaya, communicated to her in an interview shortly before his death
that he had been tasked by President Vladimir Putin to investigate and report on "military crimes".

In A Small Corner of Hell: Dispatches from Chechnya, Politkovskaya wrote:

See also
2001 Grozny Mi-8 crash
List of Second Chechen War assassinations

References

Assassinated military personnel
Russian generals
Victims of helicopter accidents or incidents
Year of birth missing
2001 deaths
Russian military personnel killed in action